The Fort Wayne Komets are a minor league ice hockey team in the ECHL. They play their home games at the Allen County War Memorial Coliseum in Fort Wayne, Indiana. This team was previously a member of the Central Hockey League (CHL), the original International Hockey League (IHL), and the second International Hockey League (UHL/IHL). Founded in the original IHL They have won four post-season championship titles in the original IHL in 1963, 1965, 1973, and 1993, four in the UHL/second IHL in 2003, 2008, 2009, and 2010, one in the CHL in 2012, and one in the ECHL in 2021. In all of North American professional hockey, only the Original Six teams of the NHL and the Hershey Bears of the AHL have played continuously in the same city with the same name longer than the Komets.

History
The original Komets franchise played in the previous iteration of the International Hockey League from 1952 until 1990. The original IHL franchise then moved to Albany, New York in 1990 as the Albany Choppers. Only two days later, the Franke family of Fort Wayne bought the Flint Spirits, moved them to Fort Wayne, and took the Komets name and history. The Albany Choppers would only play part of one season before folding on February 15, 1991.

In 1999, the second IHL Komets franchise joined the United Hockey League (which later took the IHL name in 2007). In 2010, the UHL/IHL ceased operations and the Komets joined the Central Hockey League along with the surviving members of their former league. They left the CHL for the ECHL in 2012.

For the 2014–15 season, the Komets entered into a one-year affiliation with the Colorado Avalanche of the NHL, providing a direct line to Colorado's American Hockey League affiliate, the Lake Erie Monsters.  After a successful season and partnership proving beneficial to all parties, on July 21, 2015, the Komets announced a continuance of the affiliation with the Avalanche and new AHL affiliate, the San Antonio Rampage on a two-year deal through the 2015–16 and 2016–17 seasons. However, the Avalanche and Komets mutually agreed to end the affiliation one season early in 2016. After a season operating independently of an affiliation, the Komets agreed to a one-year affiliation deal with the Arizona Coyotes and their AHL affiliate, the Tucson Roadrunners, but did not extend the affiliation after the deal ended.

On August 21, 2018, the Komets announced a new one-year affiliation agreement with the NHL's Vegas Golden Knights and AHL affiliate Chicago Wolves. The affiliation was later extended for the 2019–20 season. The affiliation with the Golden Knights ended on May 19, 2022.

On July 27, 2022, the Komets announced a new affiliation agreement with the NHL's Edmonton Oilers and their AHL affiliate, the Bakersfield Condors.

Season-by-season results
This is a partial list of the last ten seasons completed by the Fort Wayne Komets. For the full season-by-season history, see List of Fort Wayne Komets seasons

Records as of the conclusion of the 2021–22 regular season.

Players

Current roster 
Updated December 21, 2022.

Retired numbers
The Komets have honored over 40 personnel in three sections - Executive Builders, Team Personnel and Media - in the Komets Hall of Fame established in 1988. They have also retired numbers to honor 16 people over the course of their history.

Franchise records

Scoring leaders

These are the top-ten point-scorers in franchise history. Figures are updated after each completed regular season.

''Note: Pos = Position; GP = Games Played; G = Goals; A = Assists; Pts = Points; * = still active with the team

Regular season
Most goals in a season: Merv Dubchak, 72 (1965–66)
Most assists in a season: Len Thornson, 93 (1966–67)
Most points in a season: Len Thornson, 139 (1966–67) & Terry McDougall, 139 (1978–79)
Most penalty minutes in a season: Andy Bezeau, 590 (1995–96)
Most wins in a season: Kevin St. Pierre, 43 (2003–04)
Most shutouts in a season: Kevin Reiter, 7 (2007–08) &  Kevin St. Pierre, 7 (2003–04)

Team records
 On March 28, 2008, the Komets set a new professional hockey record of 23 straight home wins. They defeated the Kalamazoo Wings 4–3.  The record ended at 25.
 On April 12, 2008, the Komets set a new Fort Wayne hockey record of 56 wins in a season. The previous record of 53 was set in 2003–04.
 On May 15, 2010, the Komets defeated the Flint Generals in Game 5 of the IHL Turner Cup Finals to win the series, four games to one, earning the Komets a "three-peat" after winning the Turner Cup in 2008 and 2009 as well.

See also

History of sports in Fort Wayne, Indiana

References

External links

 Fort Wayne Komets official website
 Fort Wayne Komets History

Defunct Central Hockey League teams
ECHL teams
Ice hockey teams in Indiana
International Hockey League (2007–2010) teams
International Hockey League (1945–2001) teams
Sports in Fort Wayne, Indiana
Ice hockey clubs established in 1952
1952 establishments in Indiana
Colorado Avalanche minor league affiliates
New York Rangers minor league affiliates
Pittsburgh Penguins minor league affiliates
Minnesota North Stars minor league affiliates
Vancouver Canucks minor league affiliates
New York Islanders minor league affiliates
Winnipeg Jets minor league affiliates
Washington Capitals minor league affiliates
Los Angeles Kings minor league affiliates
New Jersey Devils minor league affiliates
Montreal Canadiens minor league affiliates
Detroit Red Wings minor league affiliates
Columbus Blue Jackets minor league affiliates
Anaheim Ducks minor league affiliates
Arizona Coyotes minor league affiliates
Vegas Golden Knights minor league affiliates
Edmonton Oilers minor league affiliates